Pärnu Rannastaadion is a multi-purpose stadium in Pärnu, Estonia.  It is currently used mostly for football matches and is the home stadium of Pärnu JK Vaprus and Pärnu JK. The stadium seats 1,501. The address of the stadium is Ranna pst. 2, 80012 Pärnu. The stadium was renovated between 2015 and 2016.

History 

Although sporting activities on the field, where today lies Pärnu Rannastaadion, date back to 1896, when a velodrome was opened by the association of German cyclists, the stadium was officially opened on 14 July 1929. The grandstand, which was also built to host singing festivals, was able to seat around 700 people and was labelled as 'the finest of the Baltic states'.

However, on 9 February 1933 the grandstand was set on fire and the perpetrators were never caught. 6 months later, a new and larger grandstand was opened. The stadium survived World War II and hosted numerous post-war singing festivals, before undergoing renovation in the 1980s.

After Estonia regained its independence in 1991, Pärnu Stadium was left in a particularly bad condition. After years of discussions, the stadium underwent renovation in 2015 and was reopened on 9 July 2016. The new stadium complex also facilitates a hostel, gym, seminar rooms and a restaurant. 

On 31 August 2016, Pärnu Rannastaadion hosted The Estonian national football team's friendly match against Malta. Since 2018, the stadium has also been regularly used as a home venue by the Estonia U21 national team. From 2021, Pärnu has also hosted numerous UEFA Europa Conference League qualifying matches of Paide Linnameeskond.

Pärnu Rannastaadion through the years

Estonia national team matches 
Pärnu has hosted four Estonia national football team matches.

Athletics records
Updated on 6 June 2021.

Men

Women

References

External links

Home page

Football venues in Estonia
Buildings and structures in Pärnu
Multi-purpose stadiums in Estonia
Athletics (track and field) venues in Estonia
Sport in Pärnu